Gökhan Türkmen (born 1 September 1983) is a Turkish singer.

Life and career 
Türkmen was born in 1983 in Istanbul. He started learning guitar in 1997. He is a graduate of Habire Yahşi High School. In 2000, he started his career by playing guitar and singing at various places. In 2003, he graduated from Kocaeli University with a degree in industrial management. After receiving singing lessons for a year, he worked on some radio stations as a singer. His breakthrough came with the song "Büyük İnsan", which was written and composed by Serkan Söylemez. A year later, he released the single "Dön", followed by the song "Efkarlıyım", also written by Serkan Söylemez. In 2008, his debut studio album Büyük İnsan was released by İrem Records and separate music videos were released for the songs "Yan Sen", "Büyük İnsan" and "Dön".

In March 2010, he released his second studio album Biraz Ayrılık. The album was well-received by fans and critics and Türkmen's songs became among the most streamed works on radio and television. The songs "Rüya", "Biraz Ayrılık", "Ayıp Ettin" and "Bir Öykü" were turned into music videos.

Türkmen released his first EP Ara in 2012. His third studio album En Baştan was released in February 2014. The album contains 13 songs in total, with one of them being a cover. A music video for the album's lead single, "Çatı Katı, was released on YouTube in February 2014. Other songs from this album that were turned into music videos were "Sırasıyla Dene", "Sen İstanbulsun", and "Taş".

In 2015, the Sesi Çok Güzel music contest on FOX as a judge alongside Sibel Can and Sertab Erener.

Discography 
Studio albums
 Büyük İnsan (2008)
 Biraz Ayrılık (2010)
 En Baştan (2014)
 Sessiz (2016)
 Romantik (2020)
 7 (2021)

Live albums
 Akustik + (2021)

EPs
 Ara (2012)
 Synesthesia (2018)
 Virgül (2019)
 Gökhan Türkmen'le Az Biraz (2019)

Singles
 "Val Halimize" (feat. GT BAND) (2016)
 "Lafügüzaf" (2018)
 "Para Hala Bende" (feat. Aytaç Özgümüş) (2019)
 "Aşkın Enkazı" (2019)
 "Sır" (2019)
 "Gülmedi Kader" (with Birkan Nasuhoğlu) (2020)
 "Kağıt" (2020)
 "Bout D'Histoire" (2020)
 "Aşk" (2020)
 "Yüzüme Vurma" (with Serkan Emre Çiftçi) (2020)
 "Deli" (2020)
 "Mavi" (feat. Nil Rona) (2020)
 "Gelin Canlar" (feat. Burcu Arı) (2021)
 "Mahşer" (2022)
 "Herkes Yolunda" (with Mert Carim) (2022)
 "Kadınım" (with Ceylan Ertem) (from the album Duyuyor Musun?) (2022)
 "Seninle Ben" (2022)
 "Döne Döne (Live)" (with Şanışer) (2022)

Awards

References

External links 
 
 

Living people
1983 births
Turkish rock singers
Turkish pop singers
Turkish male singers
Kocaeli University alumni